Bathytoma bartrumi is an extinct species of shallow marine sea snail in the family Borsoniidae. The species B. bartrumi was discovered in 1939 by Laws.

Distribution
Bathytoma bartrumi was endemic to the island country of New Zealand in sea weir and shallow sea environments.

Description
The height of the shell varies between 35  millimeters and 60  millimeters. Adults of the species Bathytoma bartrumi made locomotion by using their mucus-mediated slips. Bathytoma bartumi also had a body symmetry which was dextrally coiled.

References

 Maxwell, P.A. (2009). Cenozoic Mollusca. pp 232–254 in Gordon, D.P. (ed.) New Zealand inventory of biodiversity. Volume one. Kingdom Animalia: Radiata, Lophotrochozoa, Deuterostomia. Canterbury University Press, Christchurch.

External links
 Laws, C. R. (1939). The molluscan faunule at Pakaurangi Point, Kaipara - No. 1. Transactions of the Royal Society of New Zealand. 68: 466-503, pls 62-67.
 A.G. Beu and J.I. Raine (2009). Revised descriptions of New Zealand Cenozoic Mollusca from Beu and Maxwell (1990). GNS Science miscellaneous series no. 27

bartrumi
Gastropods of New Zealand
Gastropods described in 1939